The 1990 Scottish League Cup final was played on 28 October 1990 at Hampden Park in Glasgow and was the final of the 45th Scottish League Cup (Skol Cup). The final was an Old Firm derby contested by Celtic and Rangers. Rangers won the match 2–1 thanks to goals from Richard Gough and Mark Walters.

Match details

Teams

References

1990
League Cup Final
Scottish League Cup Final 1990
Scottish League Cup Final 1990
1990s in Glasgow
October 1990 sports events in the United Kingdom
Old Firm matches